Toshiyuki “Tosh” Seino (born October 1938) is an American former competitive judo athlete. Seino was born in Hawthorne, California, United States. After spending several years incarcerated in an  internment camp at California's Tule Lake during World War II, he and his family moved to Japan. Seino won numerous judo competitions at both the national and international levels, beating heavyweight Olympian George Harris, despite being a middleweight. He returned to the United States at age 20.  Seino was an AAU National Champion in Judo.  Seino enlisted in the US Air Force in 1959 and served as a self defense instructor.  Seino competed in three Judo World Championships.

References

1938 births
Living people
American male judoka
Japanese-American internees
American military personnel of Japanese descent
American sportspeople of Japanese descent
Sportspeople from Hawthorne, California
Pan American Games medalists in judo
Pan American Games gold medalists for the United States
Pan American Games silver medalists for the United States
Judoka at the 1963 Pan American Games
Judoka at the 1967 Pan American Games